The Ligurian regional election of 1980 took place on 8 June 1980.

Events
The Italian Communist Party resulted the largest party, but lost some ground from five years before. After the election, Christian Democracy, the Italian Democratic Socialist Party, the Italian Liberal Party and the Italian Republican Party were able to form a government led by Republican Giovanni Persico (Organic centre-left), ousting the outgoing Communist-Socialist coalition government.

The Italian Socialist Party eventually joined the government in 1981 and Alberto Teardo, a Socialist, became President of the Region. Teardo was replaced by fellow Socialist Rinaldo Magnani, a centrist, in 1983.

Results

Source: Ministry of the Interior

1980 elections in Italy
Elections in Liguria